Caris or CARIS may refer to
Caris (name)
Caris River in Venezuela
Teledyne CARIS, a Canadian software company

See also
Cari (disambiguation)
Karis (disambiguation)